The Royal Netherlands Marechaussee (abbreviated to KMar) is the national gendarmerie force of the Kingdom of the Netherlands, performing military and civilian police duties. It is also one of the two national police forces in the Netherlands, alongside the National Police, and is one of the four branches of the Netherlands Armed Forces.

History

The  was created by King William I to replace the French Gendarmerie on October 26, 1814. The word gendarmerie had gained a negative connotation, so William called the new force "marechaussée" (he forgot the first acute accent in the document). Maréchaussée is an alternate French word for gendarmerie. In the French historical context, "Maréchaussée" had been the force's name under the Royal Ancien Regime, while the term "gendarmerie" had been adopted by the French Revolution - making the Royalist term preferable for the Dutch King.

At that time, the Marechaussee was a part of the army. The Marechaussee was tasked with maintaining public order, law enforcement, and safeguarding the main roads. Although not specifically mentioned, this included police duties for the army. As such, the Marechaussee was part of the national police.

The Marechaussee was the only police force in many small municipalities, such as Venlo, especially in the southern provinces of Limburg and North Brabant (former Generality Lands).

In 1908, Queen Wilhelmina assigned the Marechaussee the task of guarding the royal palaces, which had previously been done by gardeners. To this day, guarding a palace is called " (clog service).

After  in November 1938, the Dutch government officially closed its borders to any Jewish refugees. The Dutch Marechaussee border guards searched for them and returned any found to Germany, despite the horrors of  being well known. In 1939 Nicholas Winton succeeded with his Kindertransport, thanks to the guarantees he had obtained from Britain. After the first train, the process of crossing the Netherlands went smoothly.

This meant that the Marechaussee lost its military status and the predicate Royal. These changes did not apply to the Marechaussee outside occupied Dutch territory. About 200 marechaussees guarded the Royal Family and the Dutch government-in-exile, and provided military police services to the Princess Irene Brigade, a brigade formed in the United Kingdom, consisting of Dutchmen.

The main tasks for the Marechaussee since then have been border protection, military police and guard duties.

On July 3, 1956, Princess Beatrix became patroness of the Royal Netherlands Marechaussee.

In 1994, the national and municipal police forces were merged into 25 regional police forces and the Korps landelijke politiediensten (National Police Services Agency). The National Police transferred its airport police and security tasks (primarily Schiphol) to the Marechaussee.

In 1998, the Marechaussee became a separate Service within the armed forces.

In 2014, a team of 40 Marechausee officers went to eastern Ukraine to assist the investigation into the shooting down of Malaysian airliner MH17. They provided security for the international team and assistance in collecting evidence from the crash site.

Emblem

The emblem of the Royal Netherlands Marechaussee is, as with many other gendarmerie forces, a flaming grenade. In the 17th century, a new weapon was introduced in Europe: the hand grenade. The soldiers who handled grenades were called grenadiers. They became an elite type of soldier in all European armies. In France, the grenade symbol was adopted by the gendarmerie, and this was imitated by similar forces throughout Europe.

Present KMar

The present marechaussee is a police organisation with a military status, under the jurisdiction of the Ministry of Defense, but mostly working for the Ministry of Security and Justice and the Ministry of the Interior and Kingdom Relations. The RNLM performs the following duties:

 assistance to and replacement by the National Police
 fighting illegal immigration
 fighting international crime
 guarding the national borders
 guarding the royal palaces and the house of the Prime Minister
 military police functions for the Dutch Armed Forces
 riot control and protection
 security and police work at all civilian airports, notably Schiphol Airport
 VIP close protection including the Royal Family and high-ranking government officials
 Special Protection Assignments Brigade (BSB), special forces for arrests, surveillance and protection
 KMOO, the Military Police Service

The first four units are territorial, other two have national rather than regional responsibilities.

Future 
The Royal Netherlands Marechaussee wants to define its tasks better so that tasks can be carried out in a targeted manner. The KMar also wants to be deployed more as a team, in the future and to avoid having to operate as an individual. At the same time it wants to operate better through automation and the purchase of new systems, especially with regard to ICT and tactical deployment of vehicles/boats and aircraft.

The purchase of new equipment is also part of this, including the GBB (Armed Civil Aviation Security) and the HRB (High Risk Security) are getting new Baltic vests. The YPR-765 is also being replaced with the Iveco Medium Tactical Vehicle. Dutch Defense Vehicles (DDV) is also working on a mobile command post and a mobile interrogation room, both based on the Iveco Daily. DDV calls these vehicles AthenA.

Ranks

Officer ranks

Other ranks

Cadet ranks at the Royal Military Academy

Equipment
 Colt Canada C8NLD
 Glock 17
 Heckler & Koch HK416
 Heckler & Koch MP5
 FN MAG (only on AIFV armoured vehicles)

Spelling
In the course of time the two acute accents of the French spelling (Maréchaussée) were dropped. The lowest ranking personnel are referred to as marechaussees (without the capital M), a rank comparable to lance corporal and corporal.

See also
 Marechaussee Museum
 Constabulary
 Dutch police
 Gendarmerie

References

External links

 Marechaussee information on the Defence Ministry website (in English)
 Official Marechaussee website (in Dutch)

 
Netherlands Armed Forces
Military units and formations established in 1814
1814 establishments in the Netherlands
Netherlands